Leninsk is a rural locality (a selo) and the administrative center of Leninskoye Rural Settlement, Kudymkarsky District, Perm Krai, Russia. The population was 592 as of 2010. There are 11 streets.

Geography 
Leninsk is located 35 km south of Kudymkar (the district's administrative centre) by road. Yevdokimova is the nearest rural locality.

References 

Rural localities in Kudymkarsky District